Major General Arthur Gillespie Wilson  (29 September 1900 – February 1982) was an Australian Army officer.

He was educated at North Sydney Boys High School (where he was a classmate of another future Major-General, Albert Hellstrom)  and RMC Duntroon.

He was awarded a Distinguished Service Order on 6 March 1947 for his services during the Second World War. He was appointed to the British Commonwealth Occupation Force in Japan.

He was awarded Commander of the Order of the British Empire in the 1955 New Year Honours.

References

Australian generals
People educated at North Sydney Boys High School
Military personnel from New South Wales
Australian Army personnel of World War II
1900 births
1982 deaths